Will was a Canadian electronic music act founded by Rhys Fulber and Chris Peterson, both members of Front Line Assembly and Delerium at different times. The style was heavy medieval ambient industrial with sampled strings and featured growled vocals by John McRae, who later continued to work with Chris Peterson in the project Decree.

Discography
 Pearl of Great Price (1991, Third Mind)
 Word•Flesh•Stone (1992, Third Mind)
 Déjà-Vu (2000, COP International) – re-release of the first two releases with some changes to tracks

References

External links

Musical groups established in 1991
Musical groups disestablished in 1992
Musical groups from Vancouver
Canadian electronic music groups
Canadian industrial music groups
Third Mind Records artists
1991 establishments in British Columbia
1992 disestablishments in British Columbia